Perophora regina is a species of colonial sea squirt in the genus Perophora. It is native to the tropical western Atlantic Ocean where it is found growing on mangrove roots on the Belize Barrier Reef.

Description
A colony of Perophora regina consists of a mat of slender, branching stolons, with short-stalked zooids growing at intervals. The zooids are so crowded together in mature colonies that the surface of the colony appears smooth. Like Perophora viridis, the zooids have four rows of stigmata and the muscles in the mantle wall are predominantly longitudinal. This tunicate broods its embryos in a pouch at the lower right side of the atrium.

Distribution and habitat
Perophora regina is found in scattered locations on the Belize Barrier Reef where it is found growing profusely on mangrove roots in fast moving water. It sometimes grows loosely over the surface of sponges such as Haliclona. It does not seem to be tolerant of wide variations in salinity and temperature.

References

Enterogona
Animals described in 1987